Bachem Holding AG is a Swiss bio-technology company active in the fields of chemistry, biochemistry and pharmaceuticals. It specializes in the commercial production of peptides and complex organic compounds as active pharmaceutical ingredients, in the production of peptide-based biochemicals and in the development of manufacturing processes for these compounds. It was founded in 1971 and is a subsidiary of Ingro Finanz AG. The head office is in Bubendorf in the canton of Basel-Landschaft; there are production sites in Vionnaz in the canton of Valais, in the Californian cities of Vista and Torrance, and in Great Britain in St Helens near Liverpool, with a sales and distribution site in Tokyo. At the end of 2017, it had 1057 employees, revenue of CHF 261.6 million, and net income of CHF 41.8 million.

History 

In 2013 the company entered an agreement with GlyTech Inc. to cooperate on the production of  glycosylated proteins and peptides.

In 2015 it bought American Peptide, a bio-technology company in Sunnyvale, California.

References

External links
 

Biotechnology companies established in 1971
Biotechnology companies of Switzerland
Companies listed on the SIX Swiss Exchange